The women's shot put event at the 1968 European Indoor Games was held on 10 March in Madrid.

Results

References

Shot put at the European Athletics Indoor Championships
Shot